Erma-Gene Evans (born 26 January 1984 in Castries) is a Saint Lucian javelin thrower.

Erma-Gene holds the Saint Lucia national records for women's Javelin Throw.  She attended Leon Hess Comprehensive Secondary School and Sir Arthur Lewis Community College in Castries, before pursuing undergraduate studies in marketing at the University of Texas el Paso.

Erma-Gene was a CARIFTA bronze medallist in  2001, then a silver medallist in  2002 and  2003, her last year as a junior. But competing at the Pan American Junior Track & Field Championships that year in Bridgetown, Barbados, she set a meet record and national record of  49.67 to take gold. For that feat, she was named 2003 junior and senior female Athlete of the Year in St. Lucia as well as the junior and senior Sportswoman of the Year.

In 2004, Erma-Gene took up studies at UTEP, and began training with coach Mika Laaksonen. She was third in the javelin (48.86/160-4) at the 2004 North America, Central America and Caribbean Athletic Championships on 30 July. In 2005, her mark of 52.27 was the top throw in her flight during the qualifying round of the NCAA Championships, but she was unable to compete in the final due to injury. She was a runner-up at the NCAA Midwest Regional, and at the WAC Championships. She reset the Saint Lucia national record winning the Spira Invitational with a season-best of 172-10 (52.68) on 16 April 16 and was named the WAC Athlete of the Week. She has previously broken the national record with a mark of 172-8 (52.64) to take fourth at the Texas Relays on 9 April.

Her form improved in 2006, when she gained All-America honors, taking sixth at the NCAA Championships with a throw of 51.45, having earlier that season won the C-USA Championship with a national record toss of 180-5 (55.00) a distance that ranked second in school history. She finished seventh at the 2006 Central American and Caribbean Games. She was also fourth at NACAC that season.

Her senior year at UTEP was eventful. Erma-Gene won the C-USA Conference title with a new national record of 56.45m, qualifying her for the 2008 Olympic Games in Beijing, China. At the 2007 NCAA Championships she finish ed second.

Leading up to the Olympics, Erma-Gene recorded her career-best throw of 57.22 metres in March 2008 in El Paso. In Beijing she was 30th overall  in qualifying.

Progression

References

1984 births
Living people
Saint Lucian javelin throwers
Athletes (track and field) at the 2008 Summer Olympics
Olympic athletes of Saint Lucia
UTEP Miners women's track and field athletes
Female javelin throwers
Saint Lucian female athletes